Mary Elizabeth Jackson (1867–1923), was an African-American female suffrage activist, YWCA leader and writer. She worked with the Northeast Federation of Colored Women's Club and lead the suffrage movement with the National Association of Colored Women.

History 
Mary Elizabeth Jackson was born 1867 in Providence, Rhode Island to Henry and Amelia Jackson. She was a member of the Pond Street Baptist Church and founding member of the Providence NAACP.

Jackson worked as a civil service employee, working at the Labor Department of the State of Rhode Island. In 1917, during World War I, she was appointed as "Special Industrial Worker among Colored Women" for the National War Work Council of the YMCA in which she analyzed employment trends and recommended programs to encourage fair employment of women of color.

Jackson served as president of the Rhode Island State Federation of Colored Women's Club (also known as the Rhode Island Association of Colored Women's Clubs) for 8 years. She served as the first vice president of the Alpha Suffrage Club.

Writing 
Jackson wrote for the NAACP’s magazine The Crisis in November 1918 entitled, “The Colored Woman in Industry” which was detailing the working conditions of women in factories and a hopeful future of African-American women in industry. In this writing she describes discusses inequality of wages between races, and between genders, as well as the prejudices and poor working conditions.

References

External links 
 Article: “The Colored Woman in Industry”,  by Mary E. Jackson from November 1918, The Crisis magazine, volumes 15–18.
 Article: "The Self-Supporting Woman and the Ballot" by Mary E. Jackson from August 1915, The Crisis magazine, volume 10.

1867 births
1923 deaths
African-American women writers
African-American feminists
American suffragists
People from Providence, Rhode Island
NAACP activists
African-American suffragists
Women civil rights activists
20th-century African-American people
20th-century African-American women